Vigolo Vattaro (Vìgol in local dialect) is a comune (municipality) in Trentino in the northern Italian region Trentino-Alto Adige/Südtirol, located about  southeast of Trento.

Vigolo Vattaro borders the following municipalities: Trento, Pergine Valsugana, Bosentino and Besenello.

Demographic evolution

References

Cities and towns in Trentino-Alto Adige/Südtirol